The third season of the Singaporean reality talent show Project SuperStar began on 18 August 2014. It was broadcast on MediaCorp Channel U and simulcast on Toggle Live. The show was hosted by Dasmond Koh, with Jeremy Chan and Shane Pow acting as managers for the contestants. Roy Li and Dawn Yip returned as judges for their third season, and they were joined by Eric Ng who appeared as a judge for the first time. Taiwanese singer Tiger Huang and former judge Lee Wei Song served as the guest judges at the grand final.

On 26 October 2014, Alfred Sim the male category winner who was mentored by Dawn Yip, was declared the overall winner of the season; with female category winner Abigail Yeo, also mentored by Dawn Yip named as the overall runner-up. Justin Chua and Tan Yan Hua, both mentored by Eric Ng, were the runners-up of their respective category. Sim received a cash prize of $15,000 and a one-year management contract with MediaCorp, while Yeo was awarded a cash prize of $10,000, and Chua and Tan $2,500 each.

Judges and hosts
The judges were revealed during the round three auditions on 5 July 2014. Billy Koh, Lee Wei Song and Anthony Png, who were the judges for the past two seasons, did not return for their third season. Roy Li and Dawn Yip were the only two judges from the previous seasons to return to the show. They were joined by Eric Ng who was announced as the third and final judge of the season. Despite not returning for his third season, Lee appeared as a guest judge during the grand final, together with Taiwanese singer Tiger Huang.

The season also saw a makeover in the hosting lineup, which was announced on 20 May 2014. Former hosts of the show Quan Yi Fong and Jeff Wang did not return for their third season as well, and were replaced by Dasmond Koh with season two quarter-finalist Jeremy Chan and Shane Pow as the co-hosts.

Development

Auditions
For the first time in Project Superstar history, the auditions were opened to the public without any restrictions on the age and nationality. For non-Singaporeans or permanent residents, applicants must hold a student pass or work permit that is valid till the end of October 2014, to ensure their stay in Singapore throughout the contest period. Besides removing the age and nationality restrictions from the competition, the show also allowed participants to audition in groups that is made up of not more than five members and the members must be of the same gender. The highlights of the auditions were aired during the premiere of the show on 18 August 2014.

Campus auditions
The auditions first started in the campus of three local institutions Ngee Ann Polytechnic, Singapore Polytechnic and Temasek Polytechnic on 6, 7 and 19 May 2014 respectively. Only the students and staff of the respective institution were allowed to apply for the campus auditions. The campus auditions were hosted by radio personalities from Y.E.S. 93.3FM, with Chen Ning, Kenneth Chung and Xie Jiafa hosting at the Ngee Ann Polytechnic, Singapore Polytechnic and Temasek Polytechnic auditions respectively. Auditionees who were successful in the campus auditions advanced to the round two auditions.

Round one auditions
The first round of the auditions began on 7 June 2014 and was held at Caldecott Broadcast Centre. More than 6,000 hopefuls turned up for the auditions at the Caldecott Broadcast Centre. Due to overwhelming response, the audition period for this round of the competition was extended till the following day on 8 June 2014. The second day of the round one auditions was not opened to any new applications and was strictly held for the auditionees who were unable to meet the judges on 7 June 2014 due to time constraints. Successful auditionees from round one auditions advanced to the round two auditions.

Round two auditions
The second round of the auditions was held on 22 June 2014 at Square 2. 100 contestants each from the male and female category made it to this stage of the competition. From the top 200 contestants who participated in this round of the auditions, the judges narrowed them down to the 80 who progress onto the third and final round of the auditions.

Invitations-only auditions
The show also held a special invitations-only auditions for local professional singers who were scouted by the producers of the show. The scouted contestants attended the audition on 24 June 2014 at Caldecott Broadcast Centre. Successful auditionees from this round of the competition advanced to the round three auditions.

Round three auditions
The third and final round of auditions was held on 5 July 2014 at UE Convention Centre. Contestants were required to prepare three different songs to perform for the judges at this stage of the competition, with each of the songs either in karaoke, a capella or piano instrumental version. Among the three songs that were prepared by a contestant, the judges would decide which song they would like to hear and the contestant would have to perform the song on the spot. The final 12 contestants who would advance to the live shows were announced at the end of auditions. Similar to The Voice and The X Factor, each of the judges chose two male and two female contestants from the final 12 to form a team of their own, and then the judges will mentor their respective contestants throughout the competition.

Promotions

Auditions
Three recruitment teasers and one recruitment trailer were released to promote for the campus and first round auditions. The third and final recruitment teaser featured a cameo appearance by MediaCorp artiste Desmond Tan. In addition, promotional videos featuring season one and season two semi-finalists Candyce Toh and Kelvin Soon, former Fahrenheit member Wu Chun, Y.E.S. 93.3FM radio personalities Chen Ning and Kenneth Chung, Taiwanese singer-actress Phoebe Huang, singer Alex Lam and MediaCorp artiste Desmond Tan were released to provide singing and audition tips to the auditionees.

A print advertisement titled "Make Sweet Dreams Come True" were released in both English and Mandarin version to promote for the recruitment.

Finalists
Profile trailers which introduce the final 12 contestants were released prior to the premiere of the show. The profile trailers were presented in individual and category versions. The final 12 contestants also made appearance in various events or meet-and-greet sessions to promote the show. The details are as follows;

Youth Collaboration
The Youth Collaboration is an online episodic series that features the finalists of the show, together with four youths who have strong interest in music and performing arts. The series brings the audience through the musical journey of the youths and how it has made a positive influence to their lives. The programme also sees the finalists collaborating with the youths by putting up street performances. The programme, hosted by Chen Ning and Kenneth Chung, is broadcast through Catch-up TV on xinmsn and Toggle Now application.

Finalists
Unlike the previous two seasons, the number of finalists that were chosen to advance to the live shows was reduced from the usual 24 (12 per gender) down to 12 (six per gender). In a format similar to The X Factor and The Voice, in addition to splitting the finalists into their respective gender categories, each judge chose two finalists from each category to form a coaching team of their own to mentor them. The two co-hosts of the show also selected three contestants from each category to act as their managers throughout the competition.

Key:

Key:
 – Winner
 – Runner-up
 – Gender/Category runner-up

Live shows
The live shows started on 25 August 2014. As with previous seasons, each week's song choices followed a particular theme. Contestants from the male category perform on the even weeks from week two to eight, while the female category contestants perform on the odd from week three to nine. The hour-and-a-half-long live shows would take place on Mondays and would split into two segments. Each contestant performs during the first hour, while guest performances and eliminations take place during the final half hour.

A new interactive viewer component was featured for this season: The method of voting via paid phone calls and text messaging which has been used for the past two seasons of the show  was instead replaced by a free-of-charge online voting method via the Toggle Now application. Each contestant would be given a designated voting window during their performance on the show. During the voting window, users of the Toggle Now application would be presented with the "Yes! I vote!" (known as "Yes! I want to vote!" on week two) and "No. I forfeit!" (known as "No, I do wish to vote." on week two) buttons on screen. Every selection of the "Yes! I vote!" button by the viewers would be counted as a vote towards the respective contestant, while the selection of the "No. I forfeit!" button would not make an effect to the vote count. The voting procedure is limited to one vote per contestant per performance per device.

The results were announced based on the accumulated points from the judges and the public's votes. Each of the judges would be able to award points to a contestant after their performance on the show and the total score from the three judges would carry a weightage of 75% for the respective contestant's overall scores. The remaining 25% of the overall score would be based on the public votes received from the Toggle Now application. The contestant who receives the lowest combined score (the judges scores and the public votes) would be eliminated at the end of the show. Contrary to previous seasons of the show, the judges' points were not revealed; the ranking result of the public votes were instead shown to the viewers before the results announcement. Another notable change, the Revival round, a round where singers perform to reinstate them from the competition, did not return this season.

Show changes for the grand final
The grand final took place on 26 October 2014, Sunday at MediaCorp Studios, with the duration of the show extended to three hours. For the first time in Project SuperStar history, four finalists, up from two, represented in the finale, and the finals was not held at the Singapore Indoor Stadium. The audience were still given the power to vote, but for just one contestant per category after a round of performances using a single device, thus restricting them to vote for both of the remaining contestants from each category for each round of the competition (or both the male category winner and female category winner during the overall winner decider). With the addition of two guest judges, score from each of the judges now carry a 15% weightage for the respective contestant's combined score, amounting to a 75% total. The public vote weightage remained as 25%.

Musical guests
Each live show featured musical performances from various artists. Season two overall winner Daren Tan performed on the first live show. The second live show featured performance from local singer-songwriter and Sing My Song contestant Ling Kai, while season one overall runner-up Kelly Poon appeared on the third. Local a cappella group and The Sing-Off China runners-up MICappella appeared on the fourth live show, while season two top 16 contestant Jeremy Chan and top 6 finalist Kelvin Soon performed on the fifth and sixth respectively. The Freshman, made up of season two overall runner-up Lydia Tan and female runner-up Carrie Yeo, performed on the seventh live show. The eighth live show featured performances from The Voice of China season two top 12 finalist Bi Xia. The grand final would also feature performances from The Voice of China season three overall third-place finisher Yu Feng and top 16 finalist Li Jiage, as well as guest judge Tiger Huang.

Results summary
Colour key:

Live show details

Week 2: Top 6 Male (25 August)
Theme: No theme
Musical guest: Daren Tan ("走过年少")

Week 3: Top 6 Female (1 September)
Theme: No theme
Musical guest: Ling Kai ("随机播放")

Week 4: Top 5 Male (8 September)
Theme: Songs for their loved ones
Musical guest: Kelly Poon ("情人")

Though it was not specifically mentioned on the show as the week's theme, each contestant performed a song as a dedication to their loved ones. Beginning this week, only a selected contestants (regardless of the overall placement) are immediately declared safe during the results, leaving the rest to have their results announced via the traditional computerized system; those contestants who were declared safe via this manner are highlighted in blue.

Week 5: Top 5 Female (15 September)
Theme: Songs for their loved ones
Musical guest: MICappella ("伤心的人别听慢歌(贯彻快乐)")
As in previous week, each contestant performed a song as a dedication to their loved ones, and during the results, only the selected artists which gone through by a computer system and declared as safe are highlighted in blue.

Week 6: Top 4 Male (22 September)
Theme: Medley challenge
Musical guest: Jeremy Chan ("海芋恋")

It was revealed by judge Roy Li on week five's live show that the contestants would be singing a medley of songs for their performances this week. The contestants started off their performances with a ballad, followed by an uptempo song. As such for the Top 5 rounds, only the selected artists which had their results revealed as safe by a computer are highlighted in blue.

Week 7: Top 4 Female (29 September)
Theme: Medley challenge
Musical guest: Kelvin Soon ("大城小爱")

Similar to the previous week, the contestants sang a medley of songs for their performances this week. The contestants started off their performances with a ballad, followed by an uptempo song. Similar to the results for the fourth consecutive week, two contestants faced results via a computerized system, with the contestant declaring safe was highlighted in blue. With the elimination of Amanda Lee, Roy Li no longer has any contestants left on his coaching team.

Week 8: Top 3 Male (6 October)
Themes: Judges' choice; contestant's choice
Musical guest: The Freshman ("眼镜蒙蒙的" / "眼镜找朋友" and "逞强")

For the first time this season, the contestants performed two songs each; one chosen by the judges (composed by either judge Roy Li or Eric Ng), and another selected on their own. The viewers were also able to cast up to two votes (one for each performance) for each contestant using a single device, as opposed to one vote per contestant per device in the previous weeks.

Week 9: Top 3 Female (13 October)
Themes: Judges' choice; contestant's choice
Musical guest: Bi Xia ("像梦一样自由" and "大闹天宫")

Similar to the previous week, the contestants performed two songs each; one chosen by the judges (composed by either judge Roy Li or Eric Ng), and another selected on their own. The viewers were also able to cast up to two votes (one for each performance) for each contestant using a single device, as opposed to one vote per contestant per device in the previous weeks. For the first time in the show's history, a contestant sang her own original song instead of a cover version of a song by another recording artist.

Week 10: Grand Final Prelude (20 October)
The top 12 finalists, together with the judges and managers, returned on this special grand final prelude episode to share about their experience on the show and how the top 4 finalists were preparing for the grand final. The episode was pre-recorded and did not feature any interactive viewer component.

A sing-off segment was included on the show for the eight eliminated finalists. Each of them performed a solo song of their choice, with the judges and the top 4 finalists deciding on the best performer from each category. The two winners of the sing-off, which were given the title "King of Sing-Off" and "Queen of Sing-Off", were awarded with an Eversoft-sponsored gift pack worth over $120 and the opportunity to perform solo during the grand final opening group performance.

The Marigold Peel Fresh Refreshing Award (a cash prize of $1,000 and a gift pack worth $220) was also given out during the show, with the top 12 finalists voting for the winner who possesses a personality of "sunshine", "liveliness" and "youthfulness"; the award was won by Amanda Lee.

Week 11: Grand Final (26 October)
Taiwanese singer Tiger Huang and former judge Lee Wei Song were brought in as the guest judges for the grand final. For the first time this season, the contestants performed with a live band, instead of a backing track. In addition, the percentages of the public votes received by the contestants for their respective round of performances were revealed on the Toggle Now application.

Part 1 Category winner decider
Themes: Category finalists duets; medley challenge
Group performance: "我相信" / "OAOA (丢掉名字性别)" / "我的歌声里" (all finalists except Justin Chua, Alfred Sim, Tan Yan Hua and Abigail Yeo; with Roy Li, Eric Ng and Dawn Yip)
Musical guests: Li Jiage ("普通朋友") and Yu Feng ("有多少爱可以重来")

The two remaining contestants from each category first paired up to perform a duet, then each performed a medley of songs – a ballad and an uptempo song with backup dancers. For the first round, the contestant's prefixes are either "M" (for male category) or "F" (for female category); the contestant (of the respective category) who received a higher combined total was crowned as the category winner and moved on to the overall winner decider; the other will be named as the category runner-up and is eliminated.

With the eliminations of Justin Chua and Tan Yan Hua, Eric Ng no longer have any remaining contestants on his team, thus Dawn Yip was guaranteed to be the winning coach by default.

Part 2 Overall winner decider
Themes: Category winners duet; winner's song
Musical guest: Tiger Huang ("我的心里只有你没有他" and "没那么简单")

The two category winners paired up to perform a duet, then each gave a solo performance of their potential winner's song. For this round, the contestant's prefixes are changed to "S", unlike other shows where it retained the "M" or "F" prefixes; the contestant who received a higher combined total (separate from the previous round's scores) was crowned as the overall winner. It was later revealed Sim received 56% of the judges' votes during the round, while Yeo garnered the remaining 44%.

Contestants' appearances on earlier talent shows
Benita Cheng and Abigail Yeo participated in the third season of Campus SuperStar. Cheng finished in eighth place while Yeo did not pass the first round of the auditions. Yeo then auditioned for the fourth season of the show but was later disqualified as she was about to admit into a polytechnic (the competition was only opened to students who were studying in secondary schools, junior colleges and institutes of technical education).
Alfred Sim auditioned for the first and second season of Project SuperStar, but failed to advance to the live shows.
Cheng, Justin Chua and Yeo appeared on Power Duet as part of the duos Dong Bei Xian, Juxtapose and Po Yin respectively. Cheng was eliminated in the quarter-final, finishing in ninth place. Chua and Yeo reached the semi-final and finished in seventh and eighth place respectively.
Germaine Ng appeared on the seventh season of One Million Star as one of the top 78 contestants, but did not make it past the preliminary round.
Jayden Chew was a contestant on Taiwanese reality television singing competition Ming Ri Zhi Xing Super Star.
See Kai Zheng appeared on Sing a Nation as one of the members of the singing group Xplosions, but was eliminated on the third week and failed to make it as one of the final three.

Reception
The grand final episode attracted a viewership of 591,000.

References

External links

2014 Singaporean television seasons